The Journal of Thermal Stresses is a monthly peer-reviewed scientific journal covering the theoretical and industrial applications of thermal stresses. It is published by Taylor & Francis. The journal was established in 1978 with Richard B. Hetnarski (Rochester Institute of Technology) as founding editor-in-chief. In July 2018 he was succeeded by Martin Ostoja-Starzewski (University of Illinois at Urbana-Champaign).

Abstracting and indexing
The journal is abstracted and indexed in:
CSA databases
Current Contents/Engineering, Computing, & Technology
Science Citation Index
According to the Journal Citation Reports, the journal has a 2020 impact factor of 3.28.

References

External links

Print: 
Online: 

Materials science journals
Monthly journals
English-language journals
Taylor & Francis academic journals
Publications established in 1978